Cheak Kluai ...   (MIT, แจกกล้วย) was the fifteenth album by Thai rock band Carabao. It was released in August 1995.

Track listing

References

1995 albums
Carabao (band) albums